Main Street Historic District is a national historic district located at Newberry, Newberry County, South Carolina.  The district encompasses 51 contributing buildings in an upper-class neighborhood of Newberry.  The district includes residences dating from about 1840 to 1950.  They include notable examples of the Italianate, Greek Revival, Neoclassical styles. Also located in the district is the St. Luke's Episcopal Church and the Newberry Associate Reformed Presbyterian Church.

It was listed on the National Register of Historic Places in 1980.

References

Historic districts on the National Register of Historic Places in South Carolina
Neoclassical architecture in South Carolina
Italianate architecture in South Carolina
Greek Revival architecture in South Carolina
Historic districts in Newberry County, South Carolina
National Register of Historic Places in Newberry County, South Carolina
Newberry, South Carolina